Cape Olyutor is a cape in the Bering Sea, in Koryak Okrug of Kamchatka Krai, Russia. It  points south at the southern end of the Olyutor Peninsula, the southern end of the Olyutor Range. It was named after the Alyutor ethnic group.

The Kereks, a former maritime hunting people of the Russian Bering Sea coast, were living between the cape and the Gulf of Anadyr.

See also
Captain Vladimir Voronin

References

 Armstrong, T., The Russians in the Arctic, London, 1958.

Landforms of Kamchatka Krai
Landforms of the Bering Sea
Olyutorsky